The men's C-1 slalom canoeing competition at the 2010 Asian Games in Guangzhou was held on 13 and 14 November at the International Rowing Centre.

Schedule
All times are China Standard Time (UTC+08:00)

Results 
Legend
DSQR — Disqualified for particular run

Heats

Semifinal

Final

References 

Official Website

External links 
Asian Canoe Confederation

Canoeing at the 2010 Asian Games